The 1971 All-Big Ten Conference football team consists of American football players chosen by various organizations for All-Big Ten Conference teams for the 1971 Big Ten Conference football season.

Offensive selections

Quarterbacks
 Maurie Daigneau, Northwestern (AP-1; UPI-1)
 Craig Curry, Minnesota (AP-2; UPI-2)

Running backs
 Eric Allen, Michigan State (AP-1; UPI-1)
 Rufus Ferguson, Wisconsin (AP-1; UPI-1)
 Billy Taylor, Michigan (AP-1; UPI-1)
 Otis Armstrong, Purdue (AP-2; UPI-2)
 Ernie Cook, Minnesota (AP-2; UPI-2)
 Al Robinson, Northwestern (AP-2)
 Ed Shuttlesworth, Michigan (UPI-2)

Ends
 Doug Kingsriter, Minnesota (AP-1; UPI-1 [tight end])
 Barry Pearson, Northwestern (AP-1; UPI-1 [wide receiver])
 Billy Joe Dupree, Michigan State (AP-2)
 Rick Sayers, Purdue (AP-2)
 Glenn Doughty, Michigan (UPI-2 [wide receiver])
 Paul Seymour, Michigan (UPI-2 [tight end])

Tackles
 Tom Luken, Purdue (AP-1; UPI-1)
 Tom McCreight, Northwestern (AP-1)
 Rick Simon, Ohio State (UPI-1)
 Jack Babcock (AP-2)
 Curtis Tucker, Michigan (AP-2)
 Jim Brandstatter, Michigan (UPI-2)
 Jim Coode, Michigan (UPI-2)
 Tom Bove, Indiana (AP-2)

Guards
 Joe DeLamielleure, Michigan State (AP-1; UPI-1)
 Reggie McKenzie, Michigan (AP-1; UPI-1)
 Tom Coyle, Michigan (AP-2; UPI-2)
 Tom Kruyer, Indiana (AP-2; UPI-2)

Centers
 Tom DeLeone, Ohio State (AP-1; UPI-1)
 Guy Murdock, Michigan (AP-2; UPI-2)

Defensive selections

Ends
 Tab Bennett, Illinois (AP-1; UPI-1)
 Mike Keller, Michigan (AP-1)
 Gary Hrivnak, Purdue (UPI-1)
 Alden Carpenter, Michigan (UPI-2)
 Wil Hemby, Northwestern (UPI-2)

Tackles
 Ron Curl, Michigan State (AP-1; UPI-1)
 George Hasenhorhl, Ohio State (AP-1; UPI-1)
 Tom Beckman, Michigan (AP-2)
 Dave Butz, Purdue (AP-2; UPI-2)
 Jim Anderson, Northwestern (UPI-2)

Guards
 Greg Bingham, Purdue (UPI-1)
 Ernest Hamilton, Michigan State (UPI-2)

Linebackers
 Mike Taylor, Michigan (AP-1; UPI-1)
 Bill Light, Minnesota (AP-1; UPI-2)
 Stan White, Ohio State (AP-1; UPI-2)
 Randy Gradishar, Ohio State (AP-2; UPI-1)
 Dave Lokanc, Wisconsin (AP-2)
 John Voorhees, Northwestern (AP-2)

Defensive backs
 Thom Darden, Michigan (AP-1; UPI-1)
 Eric Hutchinson, Northwestern (AP-1; UPI-1)
 Brad Van Pelt, Michigan State (AP-1; UPI-1)
 Craig Clemons, Iowa (UPI-1)
 Jerry Brown, Northwestern (AP-2)
 John Graham, Illinois (AP-2)
 Neovia Greyer, Wisconsin (AP-2)
 Chuck Piebes, Purdue (AP-2)
 Tom Campana, Ohio State (UPI-2)
 Jack Duston, Northwestern (UPI-2)
 Harry Howard, Ohio State (UPI-2)
 Willis Osley, Illinois (UPI-2)

Key
AP = Associated Press, selected by the AP's Midwest board and Big Ten football experts

UPI = United Press International, selected by the conference coaches

Bold = Consensus first-team selection by both AP and UPI

See also
1971 College Football All-America Team

References

All-Big Ten Conference
All-Big Ten Conference football teams